Kanai is a Japanese surname. Notable people with the surname include:

, Japanese javelin thrower
Hiroyuki Kanai, Japanese philatelist
Katsu Kanai, Japanese film director
Kikuko Kanai (1911–1986), Japanese composer
, Japanese shogi player
Kiyotaka Kanai, astronomer
Mieko Kanai, fiction writer
Mika Kanai, voice actress, also known as Mika Yamadera
Mitsunari Kanai, aikido teacher
Norishige Kanai, Japanese astronaut candidate
, Japanese businessman
, Japanese footballer
, Japanese hurdler
Yuta Kanai, actor
Yutaka Kanai (1959–1990), Japanese long-distance runner

Fictional characters
Izumi Kanai, a character in the film Battle Royale

Japanese-language surnames